Wyoming Highway 214 (WYO 214) is a  state highway in the southeastern part of Laramie County, Wyoming named Carpenter Road, that provides travel between Interstate 80/U.S. Highway 30 and the Town of Carpenter.

Route description 
Wyoming Highway 214 begins its south end in Carpenter at Laramie County Route 203-1 (Chalk Bluffs Rd.) WYO 214 heads due north past the eastern side of town. WYO 214 travels north to an end at Interstate 80/U.S. Highway 30 Exit 386. North of the interchange, Wyoming Highway 213 takes over north to Burns.

History 
Wyoming Highway 214 may have formerly connected to Old Colorado State Highway 155.

Major intersections

References 

Official 2003 State Highway Map of Wyoming
Google Maps

Transportation in Laramie County, Wyoming
214